Reinholterode is a municipality in the district of Eichsfeld, Thuringia, Germany.

References

Eichsfeld (district)